Alexander Rosen (born 10 April 1979) is a German football executive and former player who is the director of football for TSG 1899 Hoffenheim.

Playing career 

Rosen made his Bundesliga debut for Eintracht Frankfurt on 20 February 1999 when he came on as a substitute for Frank Gerster in the 86th minute in a game against TSV 1860 München. While under contract with Frankfurt, Rosen went on loan with FC Augsburg and VfL Osnabrück. After his return to Frankfurt he played in three more matches in der 2. Bundesliga before leaving for 1. FC Saarbrücken prior to the 2003–04 season. After a short stint with Sportvereinigung Elversberg he switched to Norwegian club Follo Fotball in December 2005. In Norway, Rosen also worked as an assistant for the club's management. After his two-year-stint with Follo, he moved to the Stuttgarter Kickers in the Regionalliga Süd. Rosen finished his playing career at Hoffenheim, playing his last match in December 2010.

Management career 

Rosen started his development as a sports business administrator in 2009 while still playing professional football, enrolling at the University of Applied Sciences at Schmalkalden to study sports economics. In November 2010, Rosen became Hoffenheim's development performance centre manager. In April 2013, he was promoted to head of professional football at Hoffenheim. Since October 2013, his official job title is director of football. Rosen has been frequently praised for Hoffenheim's ability to remain competitive in the Bundesliga despite its relatively small size and budget, relying on successful player development and innovative transfer moves. In July 2022, His contract was extended to 2025.

Family 

Rosen is married and has a son. His grandfather, Gerhard Niklasch, was a team captain and the record appearance-maker at BC Augsburg in the Oberliga Süd, the highest league in Germany at the time. Among others, Niklasch played with German football legend Helmut Haller.

References

External links 
 

German footballers
Germany under-21 international footballers
Germany youth international footballers
FC Augsburg players
Eintracht Frankfurt players
Eintracht Frankfurt II players
VfL Osnabrück players
1. FC Saarbrücken players
SV Elversberg players
Follo FK players
Stuttgarter Kickers players
TSG 1899 Hoffenheim II players
Expatriate footballers in Norway
1979 births
Living people
Bundesliga players
2. Bundesliga players
3. Liga players
Sportspeople from Augsburg
Association football midfielders
Footballers from Bavaria